Giacomo Keaton Gianniotti (born 19 June 1989) is an Italian-Canadian film and television actor. He studied theater at Humber College and made his acting debut in the Italian television series Medicina Generale in 2010. He went on to play recurring roles in the television series Reign (2013) and Murdoch Mysteries (2013–2014). From 2015 to 2021, Gianniotti played Dr. Andrew DeLuca in the medical drama series Grey's Anatomy.

Early life 

Giacomo Gianniotti was born 19 June 1989, in Rome, Italy. He emigrated with his family at a young age and grew up in Toronto, Ontario, Canada. He divides his time between Toronto and Rome, working in Canadian and Italian stage, films and television.

He attended high school at Cardinal Carter Academy for the Arts in Toronto, then graduated from Humber College's Theatre Program. He has also completed an actor's residency at Norman Jewison's Canadian Film Centre in Toronto.

Career 

His first experience in film was a small role in a Giulio Base's feature film featuring Shelley Winters and Vittorio Gassman, shot in the "Cinecittá" film studio in Rome. He guest starred in an episode of the Italian television series Medicina Generale in 2010. He appeared in several television shows in 2013, including Beauty & the Beast and Copper in which he starred in three episodes.

Gianniotti played a recurring role as Lord Julien in the first season of Reign. He played Leslie Garland for several episodes in Murdoch Mysteries (2013–2014). He starred as Freddy in the now cancelled television series Selfie (2014), and later acted in the made-for-TV drama film The Secret Life of Marilyn Monroe. In 2015, Gianniotti appeared in Backpackers as Andrew.

Also in 2015, he was cast as surgical intern Dr. Andrew DeLuca for the last two episodes of the eleventh season of Grey's Anatomy. On 8 January 2016, he was promoted to series regular.

In 2019, Gianniotti was one of the recipients of the Top 25 Canadian Immigrant Awards presented by Canadian Immigrant Magazine.

In 2021, Gianniotti won the Tell-Tale TV Award for Favorite Actor in a Network Drama Series for his role on Grey's Anatomy.

Personal life
On 25 November 2017, Giannotti became engaged to makeup artist Nichole Gustafson. They married on 28 April 2019 in Italy.

Filmography

Films

Television

Video games

References

External links 

 

1989 births
21st-century Canadian male actors
Canadian male film actors
Canadian male television actors
Canadian male voice actors
Cardinal Carter Academy for the Arts alumni
Italian emigrants to Canada
Humber College alumni
Living people
Male actors from Rome
Male actors from Toronto